Corporeal may refer to:

Matter (corporeal, or actual, physical substance or matter), generally considered to be a substance (often a particle) that has rest mass and (usually) also volume
Body, of or relating to the body
Corporeal (Altar Linen)
A term devised by Harry Partch to describe his philosophy of musical theatre
Corporeal mime
Corporeal punishment

See also
Ethereal (disambiguation)